Carmelo G. Garcia (born April 25, 1975) is an American politician from the state of New Jersey. He represented the 33rd Legislative District in the New Jersey General Assembly as part of the Democratic Party. He is facing one count of conspiracy to commit bribery in connection with his work as a deputy mayor of Newark, New Jersey.

Background
Garcia grew up in Hoboken and graduated from Hoboken High School. He graduated from Seton Hall University, where he received a BS in Criminal Justice and Sociology, and from Stevens Institute of Technology, where he earned a Master of Science in Information Systems (MSIS) and a Master of Information System Management (MS/IM). Garcia was one of 50 people selected to participate in Harvard University's NeighborWorks Achieve Excellence in Community Development Program, which focuses on affordable housing. He was first elected to the Hoboken Board of Education in 2002, where he held positions as president and vice president; he resigned in 2013 after being elected to the state assembly.

Career
In 1998 he was named as an aide, with an annual salary of $6,000, to Hudson County Freeholder Maurice Fitzgibbons (1954-2011). In 2006 Garcia was reprimanded by the New Jersey School Ethics Commission for his August 2005 votes on the Hoboken school board to hire his brother for a custodial position and for a $60,000 contract for Fitzgibbons' public relations firm.

Starting in 2001, Garcia worked as the first ever minority Director of Human Services under Mayor Dave Roberts. He left this position in 2007 when he accepted a job as Assistant Director for the Hoboken Housing Authority (HHA); he was also the first Latino to hold this role. In 2011, the Puerto Rican Culture Committee honored him with an Outstanding Achievement Award for his advocacy work and for being a role model to Hoboken youth. Garcia was fired from the HHA in 2014 and subsequently sued the board, claiming Mayor Dawn Zimmer was engaging in "ethnic cleansing" by removing minorities from positions of power. Garcia sued the HHA, first in 2013, then again in 2014 when the first suit was denied with prejudice. The amended suit was dismissed in January 2016 and he filed again in May 2016; this time, the HHA counter-sued him. In late 2017, the lawsuit was settled and Garcia was awarded $700,000.

In 2013, prior to his HHA contract being terminated, Garcia ran for the General Assembly in the June Democratic primary election on a ticket with State Senator Brian P. Stack and Raj Mukherji. In April, however, Judge Peter Bariso ruled that since the HHA received federal subsidies, Garcia was subject to the Hatch Act of 1939, which bans those whose salary is paid primarily through federal funds from running in partisan elections. Shortly after, an appellate court overturned Judge Bariso's decision and Garcia was deemed eligible to run for office. Stack, Mukherji, and Garcia swept the November general election and assumed office.

As part of the Assembly, he worked on the Financial Institutions and Insurance Committee, the Human Services Committee, and the Transportation and Independent Authorities Committee. During this time, he sponsored or co-sponsored 300 bills and his office authored at least 6 pieces of legislature, one of which champions for better rights for people living with Alzheimer's disease. Garcia did not seek reelection after his two-year appointment ended, citing his desire to focus on local office instead. The Hudson County Democratic Organization also denied his request to run as part of the party ticket.

In August 2015, he began campaigning against Zimmer-approved candidate Jennifer Giattino for a seat on the City Council. In November, four of five Zimmer-allied candidates won seats, including Giattino, who beat Garcia by over 200 votes.

In early 2015, Garcia began working for the nonprofit Newark Community Economic Development Corporation (NCEDC), now known as Invest Newark. He was executive vice president and chief real estate officer until April 2018.

From 2017 to 2018, he worked as the deputy mayor and acting director of Newark's Department of Economic and Housing Development (DEHD) before being replaced by John Palmieri. He was moved into the role of chief of development, which he held until April 2019. Beginning about June 2017, he also began working as the executive director of the Irvington Housing Authority in Irvington, New Jersey.

After leaving his Newark government positions about April 2019, he became the manager of a consulting firm.

Conspiracy charges
In late 2020, Garcia was identified as a co-conspirator in the federal indictment of Malik Frederick, who plead guilty to honest services wire fraud and falsifying his 2017 taxes. Garcia was allegedly offered bribes in exchange for using his official positions within the city "as specific opportunities arose" for conspirators Frank Valvano Jr. and Irwin Sablosky to obtain real estate. He was charged with conspiracy to commit bribery in connection with the business and transactions of a federally funded local government and organization, that being the NCEDC (Invest Newark) and the DEHD. Garcia is alleged to have accepted expensive jewelry and more than $25,000 in cash from Valvano and Sablosky.

As of 2021, he is no longer listed as executive director of the Irvington Housing Authority.

Personal life
Garcia is married to Margarita and has four children.

He has served as a board member for the Act Now Foundation for Alzheimer's Disease and educational group African Views and is the founder of the Save the Youth Academy, an after-school hip-hop dance program at Hoboken High School aimed at at-risk youth. Garcia, along with other Democrats on his 2013 legislative ticket, endorsed Chris Christie in his successful bid for re-election to Governor of New Jersey

References

External links
Personal website (archive)

Living people
1975 births
Democratic Party members of the New Jersey General Assembly
Politicians from Hoboken, New Jersey
Seton Hall University alumni
Stevens Institute of Technology alumni
Hispanic and Latino American state legislators in New Jersey
21st-century American politicians